Lissac is a commune in Haute-Loire department, France.

Population

See also
Communes of the Haute-Loire department

References

Communes of Haute-Loire